The Seoul National University Korean Language Education Center provides Korean as a foreign language instruction   to foreigners in Korea. Located in Gwanak-gu, Seoul, the program is one of the three Korean language programs approved by the  Blakemore Foundation for its advanced study grants for 2013.

References

External links
KLEC homepage

Korean-language education
Seoul National University